Chromodomain-helicase-DNA-binding protein 1-like (ALC1) is an enzyme that in humans is encoded by the CHD1L gene. It has been implicated in chromatin remodeling and DNA relaxation process required for DNA replication, repair and transcription. The ALC1 comprises ATPase domain and macro domain. On the basis of homology within the ATPase domain, ALC1 belongs to Snf2 family.

Function

In development

CHD1L, a DNA helicase, possesses chromatin remodeling activity and interacts with PARP1/PARylation in regulating pluripotency during developmental reprogramming.  The CHD1L macro-domain interacts with the PAR moiety of PARylated-PARP1 to facilitate early-stage reprogramming and pluripotency in stem cells.  It appears that CHD1L expression is vital for early events in embryonic development.

In DNA repair

To allow the critical cellular process of DNA repair, the chromatin must be remodeled at sites of damage.  CHD1L (ALC1) a chromatin remodeling protein, acts very early in DNA repair.  Chromatin relaxation occurs rapidly at the site of a DNA damage.  This process is initiated by PARP1 protein that starts to appear at DNA damage in less than a second, with half maximum accumulation within 1.6 seconds after the damage occurs.  Next the chromatin remodeler CHD1L (ALC1) quickly attaches to the product of PARP1, and completes arrival at the DNA damage within 10 seconds of the damage.  About half of the maximum chromatin relaxation, due to action of  CHD1L (ALC1), occurs by 10 seconds. This then allows recruitment of the DNA repair enzyme MRE11, to initiate DNA repair, within 13 seconds.  MRE11 is involved in homologous recombinational repair.  CHD1L (ALC1) is also required for repair of UV-damaged chromatin through nucleotide excision repair.

Related gene problems
1q21.1 deletion syndrome
1q21.1 duplication syndrome

With 1q21.1 deletion syndrome a disturbance occurs, which leads to increased DNA breaks. The role of CHD1L is similar to that of helicase with the Werner syndrome

References

External links

Further reading